Patricia Janet Mella (born August 29, 1943) is a Canadian politician and former teacher. Mella was Prince Edward Island Progressive Conservative Party (PC) leader from 1990 to 1996 and an elected member of the Legislative Assembly of Prince Edward Island from 1993 to 2003.

She was born Patricia McDougall in Port Hill, Prince Edward Island (along with her twin sister, Peggy) and was educated at Saint Dunstan's University and the University of Prince Edward Island. A teacher and lecturer, she married Angelo Mella while teaching at St. Patrick's College in Ottawa.

Mella entered political life, having been an unsuccessful candidate in the 1989 provincial election as a member of the Prince Edward Island Progressive Conservative Party. She served as the Leader of the party from 1990 to 1996 and Leader of the Opposition from 1993 to 1996. She represented 3rd Queens from 1993 to 1996, and then Glen Stewart-Bellevue Cove from 1996 to 2003.

Elected with the government of Premier Pat Binns in 1996, she served as Provincial Treasurer (Minister of Finance) until 2003.

Mella retired from the legislature before the 2003 provincial general election and did not reoffer.

In 2004, Mella was appointed with Douglas MacArthur and Matt Power to chair the Prince Edward Island Conservative Party of Canada federal election campaign.

Mella is a sister of Canadian businessman Don McDougall, who was a founder of the Toronto Blue Jays.

References 

 Entry from Canadian Who's Who

1943 births
Living people
Women government ministers of Canada
Female Canadian political party leaders
Finance ministers of Prince Edward Island
Members of the Executive Council of Prince Edward Island
People from Queens County, Prince Edward Island
Progressive Conservative Party of Prince Edward Island MLAs
Progressive Conservative Party of Prince Edward Island leaders
Female finance ministers
Women MLAs in Prince Edward Island
21st-century Canadian politicians
21st-century Canadian women politicians